Guðjón  is an Icelandic given name. 

Guðjón Arnar Kristjánsson (born 1944), Icelandic MP and chairman of the Liberal Party
Guðjón Samúelsson (1887–1950), State Architect of Iceland
Guðjón Valur Sigurðsson (born 1979), Icelandic handball player
Guðjón Þórðarson (born 1955), Icelandic former footballer and manager

Icelandic masculine given names